"Only Human" is a song by British singer Example. It was released on 26 March 2014 through Epic Records as an instant download when pre-ordering his fifth studio album Live Life Living. The song is written and produced by Example, Sheldrake and Alf Bamford.

Background and release
"Only Human" was first performed live at a pre-festival warm-up show at the O2 Academy Bristol on 6 June 2013.

On March 26, Example released the song as a promotional single.

Track listing

Personnel
 Elliot Gleave - vocals, production
 Andy Sheldrake - co-production, guitars
 Alfie Bamford (Technikal) - additional production, programming

2014 songs
Electronica songs
Example (musician) songs
Sony Music singles
Songs written by Example (musician)
Songs written by Technikal